Beverley Gail Allitt (born 4 October 1968) is an English serial killer who was convicted of murdering four infants, attempting to murder three others and causing grievous bodily harm to a further six at Grantham and Kesteven Hospital, Lincolnshire, between February and April 1991. She committed the murders in her capacity as a State Enrolled Nurse on the hospital's children's ward. 

Allitt allegedly administered large doses of insulin to at least two of her victims, and a large air bubble was found in the body of another, but police were initially unable to establish how all of the attacks were carried out.

In May 1993, Allitt received thirteen life sentences at Nottingham Crown Court. Mr Justice Latham, sentencing, told Allitt that she was "a serious danger" to others and was unlikely ever to be considered safe enough to be released. Allitt is currently detained at Rampton Secure Hospital in Nottinghamshire. She became eligible for release on parole after her minimum tariff of thirty years' imprisonment expired in November 2021.

Early life
Beverley Gail Allitt was born on 4 October 1968 and grew up in the village of Corby Glen, near the town of Grantham. She had two sisters and a brother. Her father, Richard, worked in an off-licence, and her mother as a school cleaner. Allitt attended Charles Read Secondary Modern School, having failed the test to enter Kesteven and Grantham Girls' School. She often volunteered for baby-sitting jobs. She left school at the age of 16 and took a course in nursing at Grantham College.

Victims

Died
Liam Taylor (seven weeks old) – was admitted to the ward for a chest infection and was murdered on 22 February 1991.
Timothy Hardwick (eleven years old) – a boy with cerebral palsy who was admitted to the ward after having an epileptic seizure. He was murdered on 5 March 1991.
Becky Phillips (9 weeks old) – admitted to the ward for gastroenteritis on 1 April 1991. She was administered an insulin overdose by Allitt and died at home two days later; her death was originally believed to have been cot death.
Claire Peck (fifteen months old) – admitted to the ward following an asthma attack on 22 April 1991. After being put on a ventilator, she was left alone in Allitt's care for a short interval during which time she went into cardiac arrest. She was resuscitated but died after a second episode of cardiac arrest, again following a period when she was left alone with Allitt.

Survivors

Kayley Desmond (then one year old) – admitted to the ward for a chest infection. Allitt attempted to murder her on 8 March 1991 but the child was resuscitated and transferred to another hospital, where she recovered.
Paul Crampton (then five months old) – admitted to the ward for a chest infection on 20 March 1991. Allitt attempted to murder him with an insulin overdose on three occasions the day before he was transferred to another hospital, where he recovered.
Bradley Gibson (then five years old) – admitted to the ward for pneumonia. He had two cardiac arrests on 21 March 1991, due to Allitt administering insulin overdoses, before he was transferred to another hospital, where he recovered.
 Michael Davidson (then six years old) – admitted to the ward for post-operative care following an operation to remove an air rifle pellet that he had been injured with in an accident. After being injected with insulin multiple times through a cannula on his hand, he had cyanosis and fell unconscious before being stabilised by other doctors on the ward. He later made a full recovery.
Yik Hung Chan (also known as Henry, then two years old) – admitted to the ward following a fall on 21 March 1991. He had an oxygen desaturation attack before he was transferred to another hospital, where he recovered.
Katie Phillips (then two months old) – Becky's twin was admitted to the ward as a precaution following the death of her sister. She had to be resuscitated twice after unexplained apnoeic episodes (which were later found to be caused by insulin and potassium overdoses). Following the second time that she stopped breathing, she was transferred to another hospital but, by this time, had incurred permanent brain damage, partial paralysis and partial blindness due to oxygen deprivation. Her parents had been so grateful for Allitt's care of Becky that they had asked her to be Katie's godmother. In 1999 Katie was awarded £2.125 million (equivalent to £ million in ), by Lincolnshire Health Authority, to pay for treatment and equipment for the rest of her life. Lincolnshire Health Authority did not accept liability, but did acknowledge that Katie was entitled to compensation.
Kayley Asher (then 13 month old) It is believed Beverley Allitt injected her with air under her armpit, causing her to have two heart attacks.

Trial and imprisonment

Allitt had attacked thirteen children, four fatally, over a 59-day period. It was only following the death of Becky Phillips that medical staff became suspicious of the number of cardiac arrests on the children's ward and police were called in. It was found that Allitt was the only nurse on duty for all the attacks on the children and she also had access to the drugs.

Four of Allitt's victims had died. She was charged with four counts of murder, eleven counts of attempted murder and eleven counts of causing grievous bodily harm. Allitt entered pleas of not guilty to all charges. On 28 May 1993, she was found guilty on each charge and sentenced to thirteen concurrent terms of life imprisonment, which she is serving at Rampton Secure Hospital in Nottinghamshire.

In the 2018 documentary Trevor McDonald and the Killer Nurse, Allitt reportedly told close friends before her trial that she would never go to prison. After one week in prison she refused to eat or drink and was moved to Rampton Secure Hospital. Two leading experts, forensic psychologist Jeremy Coid and criminologist Elizabeth Yardley, examined Allitt's mental state when she was arrested and concluded she was not mentally ill and should be in prison, not hospital. Allitt reportedly admitted to all 13 of her crimes in a failed application to remain at Rampton Secure Hospital and permanently avoid prison. None of the families of Allitt's victims had been told of her full confession in the failed application.

On 6 December 2007, Mr Justice Stanley Burnton, sitting in the High Court of Justice, London, confirmed that Allitt must serve the original minimum sentence of thirty years. It was reported that some families of Allitt's victims had previously mistakenly believed that her minimum tariff had been set at forty years. Her minimum tariff expired in November 2021, and she is thus now eligible for release on parole.

Allitt's motives have never been fully explained. According to one theory, she showed symptoms of a factitious disorder; specifically, factitious disorder imposed on another, also known as Munchausen syndrome by proxy. This disorder is described as involving a pattern of abuse in which a perpetrator ascribes symptoms to, or physically falsifies illnesses in, someone under their care in order to attract attention to themselves.

In popular culture
Allitt was the subject of a book called Murder on Ward Four by Nick Davies. A BBC dramatisation of the case, Angel of Death (2005), featured Charlie Brooks as Allitt. Allitt's story was depicted in episodes of the true crime documentaries Crimes That Shook Great Britain, Deadly Women, Born To Kill?, Evil Up Close, Britain's Most Evil Killers and Nurses Who Kill.

The Black Sabbath song "The Hand That Rocks The Cradle", is based on Allitt, according to vocalist/lyricist Tony Martin.

See also
Benjamin Geen, British nurse who convicted for carrying out similar attacks and who was nicknamed "Ben Allitt" 
Jessie McTavish, fellow British nurse convicted of murdering a patient with insulin
Colin Norris, fellow British nurse convicted of murdering four patients with insulin and of attempting to murder another
Louise Porton, fellow female British child killer
Charles Cullen
Euthanasia 
Malmö Östra hospital murders
John Bodkin Adams
Leonard Arthur
Kristen Gilbert
Harold Shipman
Maxim Petrov
Michael Swango
Dorothea Waddingham
List of serial killers in the United Kingdom
List of medical and pseudo-medical serial killers

References

1968 births
1991 in England
1991 murders in the United Kingdom
1993 in England
20th-century English criminals
Alumni of Grantham College
British female serial killers
Criminals from Lincolnshire
English murderers of children
English nurses
English people convicted of murder
English prisoners sentenced to life imprisonment
English serial killers
Living people
Medical serial killers
Nurses convicted of killing patients
People convicted of murder by England and Wales
People from Grantham
People with factitious disorders
Poisoners
Prisoners sentenced to life imprisonment by England and Wales